Kirill Dmitriyevich Sinelnikov (29 May 1901, Pavlohrad, Russian Empire — 16 October 1966, Kharkiv, Soviet Union) was a Soviet physicist of Ukrainian origin who was world renowned, considered as the greatest organizer of science the USSR has ever had. The Sinelnikov Prize for outstanding works in the field of physics is named after him.

External links
Cyril Sinelnikov

1901 births
1966 deaths
Soviet nuclear physicists
20th-century Ukrainian physicists
Academic staff of the School of Physics and Technology of University of Kharkiv